Capparales is a botanical name of an order of flowering plants. It was used in the Cronquist system for an order in subclass Dilleniidae and in the Kubitzki system, nowadays. In the 1981 version of this system it included :

 order Capparales
 family Tovariaceae
 family Capparaceae
 family Brassicaceae
 family Moringaceae
 family Resedaceae

The APG II system includes all the plants involved in the (expanded) order Brassicales. For names above the rank of family the principle of priority is not obligatory, hence the difference between the two names.

References 

Historically recognized angiosperm orders